Flaming Arrow or variation may refer to:

Weaponry
 Fire arrow, a rocket propelled arrow
 Flaming arrow, a burning arrow used to cause fires
 Rocket (firework), also called "flaming arrow"

Military
 No. 27 Squadron IAF  "Flaming Arrows" Indian Air Force squadron
 INAS 336 "Flaming Arrows" Indian Naval Air Squadron

Places
 Flaming Arrow Rock (mountain), see List of mountains in Gallatin County, Montana
 YMCA Camp Flaming Arrow, Hunt, Texas, USA; run by the YMCA of Greater San Antonio
 Flaming Arrow Scout Reservation, Lake Wales, Florida, USA; run by the Gulf Ridge Council of the Boy Scouts of America
 Flaming Arrow District, Sam Houston Council Area, Texas, USA; a regional division of Scouting in Texas

Structures
 Flaming Arrow Lodge, Bozeman, Montana, USA; an NRHP registered building, see National Register of Historic Places listings in Gallatin County, Montana
 Flaming Arrow Ranch House, Bozeman, Montana, USA; a NRHP registered building, see National Register of Historic Places listings in Gallatin County, Montana

Entertainment

Stage, television and film
 The Flaming Arrow, a film by Joris Ivens, 1912
 "Flaming Arrows", an episode in The Adventures of Tarzan movie serials, 1921
 "The Flaming Arrow", an episode in the White Eagle movie serials, 1922
 "Flaming Arrows", an episode in The Lightning Warrior movie serials, 1931
 "Flaming Arrows", an episode in The Last of the Mohicans movie serials, 1932
 "The Flaming Arrow", an episode in the television series Zorro, 1958

Literature
 The Flaming Arrow, a Star Trek: New Earth novel by Kathy Oltion and Jerry Oltion, 2000
 Flaming Arrow, novel by Cassie Edwards, 1997
 Ignea Sagitta, a poem by the Carmelites, 1270

Music
 "Flaming Arrows", a 2017 song by Carmen Justice
 "Flaming Arrow", a 2009 song by Jupiter One

Sports
 Flaming Arrows, the sports team name for Sachem School District, Long Island, New York State, US
 Arellano Flaming Arrows, now Arellano Chiefs, the sports team name for Arellano University, Manila, Philippines

Other uses
 Flaming Arrow, a cultivar of Pitcairnia pseudoundulata

See also

 Fire Arrow (disambiguation)
 
 
 
 Arrow (disambiguation)
 Flaming (disambiguation)
 Flame (disambiguation)
 Fire (disambiguation)